Urayevo is a rural locality (a selo) in Valuysky District, Belgorod Oblast, Russia. The population was 338 as of 2010. There are 6 streets.

Geography 
Urayevo is located 23 km southeast of Valuyki (the district's administrative centre) by road. Salovka is the nearest rural locality.

References 

Rural localities in Valuysky District